In molecular biology mir-711 microRNA is a short RNA molecule. MicroRNAs function to regulate the expression levels of other genes by several mechanisms.

Diagnostic use in Cutaneous T-cell Lymphoma
miR-711 is able to distinguish between malignant cutaneous T-cell lymphomas and benign skin disorders with high accuracy.

Hsp70.3 and Further Regulation
miR-711 has been found to target and suppress Heat Shock Protein 70.3 in vitro at a post-transcriptional level via its 3' untranslated region. Ischaemic preconditioning brings about reduced miR-711 levels, with downregulated cardiac myocyte levels further dependent upon NF-kappa B.

See also 
 MicroRNA

References

Further reading

External links 
 

MicroRNA
MicroRNA precursor families